Aana Valarthiya Vanampadiyude Makan is a 1971 Indian Malayalam-language film, directed and produced by P. Subramaniam. The film stars Gemini Ganesan, Rajasree, C. L. Anandan, K. V. Shanthi and Vijayanirmala. It is a sequel to the Subramaniam's 1959 film Aana Valarthiya Vanampadi. The film had musical score by K. V. Mahadevan. The film is said to be the first sequel for a Malayalam film. It was dubbed in Tamil as Yaanai Valartha Vaanampadi Magan.

Cast 

Gemini Ganesan
C. L. Anandan
Rajasree
K. V. Shanthi
Vijayanirmala
Vijayasree
Sridevi
Manorama
S. D. Subbalakshmi
T. K. Balachandran

Soundtrack 
The music was composed by K. V. Mahadevan and the lyrics were written by O. N. V. Kurup.

References

External links 
 

1970s Malayalam-language films
1971 films
Films about elephants
Films directed by P. Subramaniam
Films scored by K. V. Mahadevan
Aana2